Olson Paul (born 13 January 1952) is an Antiguan cricketer. He played in one first-class match for the Leeward Islands in 1976/77.

See also
 List of Leeward Islands first-class cricketers

References

External links
 

1952 births
Living people
Antigua and Barbuda cricketers
Leeward Islands cricketers